The Bald Mountain Mine is a large gold mine in the northern Nevada. It is an open-pit, run-of-mine, heap leach gold mine with conventional heap leaching technology and carbon absorption for ore treatment. The mine is located in White Pine County, Nevada, 110 kilometers southeast of Elko. 

Proven and probable gold reserves were:

 December 31, 2011 .... 5.102 million ounces
 December 31, 2012 .... 5.161 million ounces
 December 31, 2013 .... 2.500 million ounces 
 December 31, 2014 .... 1.361 million ounces
 December 31, 2015 .... 1.142 million ounces 
 December 31, 2016 .... 2.133 million ounces
 December 31, 2017 .... 1,698 million ounces
 December 31, 2018 .... 1.347 million ounces

In January 2016, Kinross Gold acquired Bald Mountain along with a 50% interest of the Round Mountain gold mine from Barrick Gold Corporation for $610 million in cash.

2018 production
In 2018, 284,616 ounces of gold (2017: 282,715 oz) were produced, at a cost of $547 per ounce, a 15% improvement on the previous year's cost.

See also 
Kinross Gold

References

External links
Bald Mountain mine aerial photos from Google Maps, accessed 11/9/2019 

Geography of White Pine County, Nevada
Gold mines in Nevada
Kinross Gold